ATAT, Atat, or variation, may refer to:

People
 Ali El Atat (born 1984) Lebanese soccer player
 Nader Al Atat (born 1987) Lebanese singer

Entertainment
 AT-AT 4-legged type Imperial Walker, from the Star Wars fictional universe
 ATAT, a fictional defense contractor from Strike Back, see List of Strike Back characters
 Atat (song), a 2003 song by the Filipino rock band Rivermaya

Other uses
 Arkansas Time After Time, civil rights organization
 Alpha-tubulin N-acetyltransferase, an enzyme
 A common spelling for AT&T, a telecommunications company

See also
 AT (disambiguation)
 AT&T (disambiguation)